Manuel Maldonado Vargas (born 5 October 1999) is a Venezuelan racing driver currently racing in the Euroformula Open Championship for Team Motopark. He is the cousin of former Formula One driver Pastor Maldonado.

Career

Italian F4
Maldonado's first experience in single seaters was in Italian F4 in 2016. He drove alongside Leonard Hoogenboom for the Cram Motorsport team, a lackluster first year in Italian F4 saw Maldonado fail to score any points and record his best result of 12th only 7 races into a 23 race season. He finished the season 36th sandwiched between Liechtensteiner Fabienne Wohlwend and Austrian Thomas Preining. His Dutch teammate fared much better win a singular podium finish at Imola and 2 more points scoring places to gain him a total of 20 points.

MRF Challenge
Maldonado's first points of his career came at the 1st round of the 2016–17 MRF Challenge Formula 2000 Championship where he finished 9th. Another poor season took Maldonado to 14th in the table with his best 2 finishes of 8th coming at the Buddh International Circuit. Maldonado returned for the following campaign finishing in the points 7 times with his best finish of 5th coming on two occasions. Maldonado originally finished 3rd at the second race after a poor start from pole-sitter Julien Falchero allowed Maldonado to jump into 2nd place, Indonesian driver Presley Martono kept the pressure on Maldonado all race before piping him to the line after a photo finish. Maldonado was later disqualified. The next race another penalty forced Maldonado out of the points after a drive-through penalty for jumping the start, dropped him to 15th.

British F3

Maldonado joined the Fortec Motorsport team for the 2017 BRDC British F3 Championship, he enjoyed an uneventful season with his best result coming at Silverstone Circuit where he finished 6th. He ended up 20 points ahead of closest rival Guilherme Samaia and 11 points behind Omar Ismail. The 2018 season was where Maldonado took his first career victory at a wet Oulton Park, still with Fortec, Maldonado started in 5th place however after the first corner he was leading the race. Despite a safety car and a red flag due to incidents behind them, the top 3 drove a close yet uneventful race which Maldonado came out on top. Maldonado shared the podium with teammate Tristan Charpentier and Douglas Motorsport driver Jamie Chadwick. Maldonado won one more race that season taking him to 7th in the standings, behind Billy Monger. A third season in the series with Fortec saw him partner American Kris Wright and Brit Johnathan Hoggard. Maldonado took 5 podiums that year as well as a singular win at Silverstone, a dominating race which saw him finish 4 seconds ahead of 2nd place Nicolás Varrone.

Euroformula Open 
Maldonado joined the German based team Motopark for the 2020 Euroformula open championship, this has been up to date Manuel's best season in single seaters, having had 4 podiums and finishing the season in 4th place overall in the driver's standings. Manuel showed strong pace throughout the year having 2 front row starts, one coming in at Red Bull Ring, Austria and the second one at the season finale in Barcelona at the Circuit de Barcelona-Catalunya.

Asian Le Mans Series 
Maldonado Joined the UK based team United Autosports for the 2021 Asian Le Mans Series, to make his endurance racing debut in car 23 an LMP3 Ligier with teammates Wayne Boy and Rory Penttinen, to make an extremely successful campaign by taking the championship. winning both races in Dubai and the last race in Abu Dhabi, the only race the squad didn't win was when they DNF from an alternator failure in race 1 in Abu Dhabi.

Racing record

Career summary

* Season still in progress.

Complete Italian F4 Championship results
(key) (Races in bold indicate pole position) (Races in italics indicate fastest lap)

Complete BRDC British Formula 3 Championship results 
(key) (Races in bold indicate pole position; races in italics indicate fastest lap)

Complete Euroformula Open Championship results 
(key) (Races in bold indicate pole position) (Races in italics indicate fastest lap)

Complete European Le Mans Series results
(key) (Races in bold indicate pole position; results in italics indicate fastest lap)

Complete 24 Hours of Le Mans results

Complete GT World Challenge Europe Endurance Cup results
(Races in bold indicate pole position) (Races in italics indicate fastest lap)

*Season still in progress.

Complete GT World Challenge Europe Sprint Cup results
(key) (Races in bold indicate pole position) (Races in italics indicate fastest lap)

References

External links
 

1999 births
Living people
Venezuelan racing drivers
Italian F4 Championship drivers
Formula Renault Eurocup drivers
BRDC British Formula 3 Championship drivers
MRF Challenge Formula 2000 Championship drivers
Euroformula Open Championship drivers
FIA World Endurance Championship drivers
24 Hours of Le Mans drivers
European Le Mans Series drivers
Asian Le Mans Series drivers
Sportspeople from Maracay
Cram Competition drivers
Fortec Motorsport drivers
Motopark Academy drivers
United Autosports drivers